is a town located in Yamagata Prefecture, Japan. , the town has an estimated population of 20,940 in 7108 households, and a population density of 87.5 per km².

Geography
Shōnai is located in the coastal plains of north-central Yamagata Prefecture. The Mogami River flows through the town. Mount Gassan, the highest of the Three Mountains of Dewa is at the intersection of the borders of Shōnai, Tsuruoka, Ōkura and Nishikawa.

Neighboring municipalities
Yamagata Prefecture
Tsuruoka
Sakata
Mikawa
Tozawa
Ōkura
Nishikawa

Climate
Shōnai has a Humid continental climate (Köppen climate classification Cfa) with large seasonal temperature differences, with warm to hot (and often humid) summers and cold (sometimes severely cold) winters. Precipitation is significant throughout the year, but is heaviest from August to October.

Demographics
Per Japanese census data, the population of Shōnai peaked around 1950 and has declined gradually since then. It is now less than it was a hundred years ago.

History
The area of present-day Shōnai was part of ancient Dewa Province. After the start of the Meiji period, the area became part of Higashitagawa District, Yamagata Prefecture. The town of Amarume was established on April 1, 1889, with the creation of the modern municipalities system, and the town of Karikawa on April 1, 1937. Karikawa merged with the neighboring villages of Kiyokawa and Tachiyazawa on October 1, 1954, and was renamed Tachikawa. On July 1, 2005, the towns of Tachikawa and Amarume merged to form the new town of Shōnai.

Economy
The economy of Shōnai is based on agriculture.

Education
Shōnai has five public elementary schools and two public middle schools operated by the town government, and one public high school operated by the Yamagata Prefectural Board of Education.

Transportation

Railway
 East Japan Railway Company - Uetsu Main Line
 -  - 
 East Japan Railway Company - Rikuu West Line
 -  -  -

Highway

International relations

Twin towns and sister cities
 Korsakov, Russia, since July 23, 1992

References

External links

Official website 

 
Towns in Yamagata Prefecture